Tuyên Hóa is a rural district of Quảng Bình province in the North Central Coast region of Vietnam. Its seat is the town of Đồng Lê. Speakers of the Nguồn language (which is related to Mường) are mostly located near Đồng Lê. As of 2003, the district had a population of 78,933. The district covers an area of 1,149 km2. The district capital lies at Đồng Lê.

Administrative divisions
The district is divided into one township, Đồng Lê, and 19 communes: Lâm Hóa, Hương Hóa, Thanh Hóa, Thanh Thạch, Kim Hóa, Sơn Hóa, Lê Hóa, Thuận Hóa, Đồng Hóa, Thạch Hóa, Nam Hóa, Đức Hóa, Phong Hóa, Mai Hóa, Ngư Hóa, Tiến Hóa, Châu Hóa, Cao Quảng and Văn Hóa.

References

Districts of Quảng Bình province